Amaranthus arenicola, commonly called sand amaranth or sandhill amaranth, is a plant species found in many states of the contiguous United States. It is an dioecious annual species found in sandy areas, near riverbeds, lakes, and fields. It is native to the central or south Great Plains, extending from Texas to South Dakota, and was introduced to other areas.

References

Jepson Manual Treatment
Flora of North America: Amaranthus arenicola in the U.S.

arenicola
Flora of the United States
Dioecious plants